Pentzia is a genus of African plants in the  chamomile tribe within the sunflower family. One species (P. incana) is naturalized in Australia and in the southwestern United States.

The genus is named for Swedish plant collector Hendrik Christian Pentz, 1738–1803.

 Species

 formerly included
numerous species once considered part of Pentzia now regarded as better suited to other genera: Foveolina Gymnopentzia Inulanthera Myxopappus Oncosiphon Phymaspermum Rennera

References

 
Asteraceae genera
Flora of Africa
Taxonomy articles created by Polbot